This is a list of flags used in India by various organizations. For more information about the national flag, visit the article Flag of India.

National flag

Governmental flag

Ensigns

Naval

Port authorities

Military flags

Indian Armed Forces

Army

Components

Territorial Army

Air Force

Navy

Coast Guard

Paramilitary forces

Other agencies

Former Flags of Indian Armed Forces

Indian Air Force rank flags

Indian Navy rank flags

Naval Ensigns

(British) Indian Army

(Royal) Indian Air Force

(Royal) Indian Marine/(Royal) Indian Navy

State and union territory flags 

At present there are no officially recognised flags for individual states and union territories of India. No legal prohibitions to prevent states adopting distinctive flags exist in either the Emblems and Names (Prevention of Improper Use) Act, 1950 or the Prevention of Insults to National Honour Act, 1971. In a 1994 case before the Supreme Court of India, S. R. Bommai v. Union of India, the Supreme Court declared that there is no prohibition in the Constitution of India for a state to have its own flag. However, a state flag should not dishonour the national flag. The Flag code of India also permits other flags to be flown with the Flag of India, but not on the same flag pole of in a superior position to the national flag.

Former official state flags 
The state of Jammu and Kashmir had an officially recognised state flag between 1952 and 2019 under the special status granted to the state by Article 370 of the Constitution of India.

Proposed state flags
Flags have been proposed for Tamil Nadu and Karnataka, but neither were officially adopted.

Banners of the states and union territories
When a distinctive banner is required to represent a state or union territory, the emblem of the state or union territory is usually displayed on a white field.

States

Union territories

Historical flags

Indian polities

Colonial India

British rule in India

Princely states

French India

Portuguese India

Dutch India

Danish India

Austrian India

Indian independence movement

Flags used in the Indian independence movement

Proposed flags

Dominion of India

Political flags

National parties

Political alliances

House Flags

See also 

 National Flag of India
 Flag of India at Central Park, Connaught Place
 Largest Human Flag of India
 List of Indian state flags

Notes

References

External links 

India
 
Flags